is the third studio album from the J-pop girl idol group Morning Musume, released on March 23, 2000.

Overview
This was the group's most successful album (with the exception of the "best of" albums) selling 863,300 copies and stayed at the Top 30 in the Oricon charts for 7 weeks. It had two of Morning Musume's top selling singles "Love Machine" and "Koi no Dance Site".

The album was certified Million by the Recording Industry Association of Japan for physical sales of over 1 million copies.

Legacy
In 2004, Maki Goto would later record a solo version of "Kuchizuke no Sono Ato" for her second solo album 2 Paint It Gold.

Track listing

References

External links 
3rd: Love Paradise entry on the Up-Front Works official website

Morning Musume albums
Zetima albums
2000 albums